The 1971–72 snooker season was a series of snooker tournaments played between March 1971 and April 1972. The following table outlines the results for the season's events.


Calendar

Notes

Notes

References

1971
1971 in snooker
1972 in snooker